Fox Funny (formerly 111 funny, pronounced as "triple one") was an Australian pay television channel focused on airing popular American sitcoms from the mid-2000s to present, complementing the 1980s–2005 schedule of sister network Fox Comedy. The channel was closed on 1 March 2023.

History
On 24 October 2008, the channel was launched with a promo loop on Foxtel as 111 Hits, running in 16:9 widescreen in a run-up to its official 1 November 2008 launch as a companion to The Comedy Channel. Its first programme was a special edition of Countdown with guests Jenna Elfman and Jermaine Jackson. On 1 March 2009, the channel became available to Austar subscribers. The timeshift channel 111+2 launched 15 November 2009.

After a revised logo and branding campaign rolled out over the holidays of 2013, the channel's name was officially shortened on 1 January 2014 to 111 with  the launch of TV Hits. After only four months, on 20 April 2014, it was rebranded to 111 Greats, before reverting simply to 111 on 1 August 2015. The channel launched on Fetch TV at the end of February 2017.

On 7 November 2019, 111 funny was rebranded as Fox Funny as part of Foxtel's rebranding and takeover of several networks. A high-definition feed of the network was launched alongside the rebranding.

On 26 January 2023, it was announced the channel would close on March 1, with content moving to sister channels Fox Comedy and Fox8.  Fox Funny quietly ended on that date, with its channel slot being replaced by Fox Comedy.

Programming

Programming primarily consisted of American sitcoms from Warner Bros., 20th Century Fox, Sony Pictures Television, and CBS Studios International.

As 111 launched, programming was slowly revealed through promotions on other Foxtel channels, with presenters discussing a show and their memories of it.

At launch, a majority of its shows were moved from Arena, FOX8, The Comedy Channel, TV1 and Fox Classics.

On 1 January 2014, with the addition of TV Hits following the closure of TV1, there was a change in direction to the networks catalogue of programs, with a large amount of newer material (mainly sitcoms and dramas) moved from 111 Hits to TV Hits. As a result, 111 Hits was shortened to 111. New additions to programming (which were previously shown on TV1) included classics such as Cheers, Frasier, and Get Smart, as well as newer shows such as Rules of Engagement.

On 1 November 2015, the network changed its focus solely to sitcoms. This saw the sitcoms which were moved to TV Hits the year prior returned and the removal of drama programming (with a large majority moved to other Foxtel-owned channels).

With the rebrand to Fox Funny, the channel removed sitcoms from the 80s and 90s (which moved to sister channel Fox Comedy) and became home to more recent sitcoms from the 2000s and 2010s.

Former programmes

See also

Subscription television in Australia

References

External links
 Official website

Television networks in Australia
Defunct television channels in Australia
English-language television stations in Australia
Foxtel
Television channels and stations established in 2008
Television channels and stations disestablished in 2023
2008 establishments in Australia
2023 disestablishments in Australia